The 832nd Air Division is an inactive United States Air Force organization.  Its last assignment was with Tactical Air Command, (TAC) assigned to Twelfth Air Force at Luke Air Force Base, Arizona, where it was inactivated on 1 October 1991.

The division was first activated at Cannon Air Force Base, New Mexico in October 1957 to command the two North American F-100 Super Sabre wings stationed there and to provide support for them through its 832nd Air Base Group.  It deployed all its operational squadrons to Florida during the Cuban Missile Crisis, along with the headquarters of one of its subordinate wings.

In 1964, the 366th Tactical Fighter Wing was activated at Holloman Air Force Base, New Mexico and assigned to the division.  Although initially equipped with Republic F-84F Thunderstreaks reclaimed from the Air National Guard, the 366th re-equipped with the McDonnell F-4 Phantom II, with which it moved to Vietnam in 1966.  During the Pueblo Crisis, the division was assigned a wing of the Colorado Air National Guard, whose squadrons also served in Vietnam.  Between 1968 and 1970, the 49th Tactical Fighter Wing was assigned to the 832nd.  The 49th Wing moved to the United States from Germany, but was "dual based", committed to deploy to Germany to support the North Atlantic Treaty Organization as needed.

The 832nd once again deployed forces to Southeast Asia in 1972, when the General Dynamics F-111 Aardvarks of its 474th Tactical Fighter Wing deployed to Thailand.  The division was inactivated in 1975 and its subordinate units assigned directly to Twelfth Air Force.

In 1980, the division was again activated to replace Tactical Training, Luke, whose mission and personnel it absorbed.  It continued to train fighter crews from the United States Air Force and allied countries until it was inactivated in 1991 when TAC implemented the Objective Wing organization, which called for all organizations on an installation to be assigned to a single wing.  Although the division did not directly participate in Operations Desert Shield and Desert Storm, it deployed support forces and combat elements to the combat theater.

History

Fighter operations at Cannon Air Force Base
The 832nd Air Division was activated at Cannon Air Force Base, New Mexico and assigned to Eighteenth Air Force in October 1957, when the 474th Fighter-Bomber Wing was activated as Tactical Air Command (TAC)'s second fighter-bomber wing there. The 474th joined the 312th Fighter-Bomber Wing, which had been at Cannon since 1954. The two wings, which flew the North American F-100 Super Sabre, became the air division's initial tactical components, while the 832nd Air Base Group was assigned to the division to manage support activities at George. The 312th Wing headquarters provided the cadre for the division and its former commander, Colonel William W. Momyer, became the division's first commander.  Three months after its activation, the division was reassigned to Twelfth Air Force, which moved without personnel or equipment from Germany to replace Eighteenth Air Force.

From late in 1958 through the end of 1959, the 1st Tow Target Squadron, stationed at Biggs Air Force Base, Texas, and primarily equipped with the Martin B-57 Canberra, but also flying a few Douglas B-26 Invaders was attached to the division.  The primary mission of this squadron was to provide targets for the Army Anti-Aircraft Artillery School at Fort Bliss. In December 1959, the 312th Wing and its components were inactivated and its mission, personnel and aircraft transferred to the 27th Tactical Fighter Wing, which moved to Cannon from Bergstrom Air Force Base, Texas without personnel or equipment, when Bergstrom became a base for dispersed Boeing B-52 Stratofortress bombers of Strategic Air Command.

The 27th Wing deployed to MacDill Air Force Base, Florida during the Cuban Missile Crisis from October to December 1962.  The operational squadrons of the 474th Wing also deployed to Florida during the crisis, although 474th Wing headquarters remained at Cannon with the division.

Command of wings at multiple bases

The 366th Tactical Fighter Wing, flying Republic F-84F Thunderstreaks at Holloman Air Force Base, New Mexico was assigned to the division in October 1964.  This marked the first time that a wing at a base other than Cannon was assigned to the 832nd.  Within a few months of its assignment, the 366th began converting to the McDonnell F-4 Phantom II.  After its conversion was complete and it was combat ready the 366th Wing moved to Phan Rang Air Base, Viet Nam in March 1966 and was reassigned.

In September 1965, the 474th Wing was stripped of its personnel and equipment and became a "paper organization" for the next year.  In anticipation of converting the wing to fly the General Dynamics F-111 Aardvark, it began to receive a few personnel in the fall of 1966, but these people were withdrawn in June 1967 and the 474th remained unmanned until January 1968, when it moved to Nellis Air Force Base, Nevada and was reassigned.

As a result of the Pueblo Crisis the 140th Tactical Fighter Wing, an F-100 wing of the Colorado Air National Guard, was called to federal service on 25 January 1968 and assigned to the division the following day.  Two of its fighter squadrons were transferred to wings in Vietnam after becoming combat ready and the wing became non-operational, transferring on paper to Cannon until it was released from active duty on 30 April 1969.

In July 1968, the 49th Tactical Fighter Wing, equipped with McDonnell F-4 Phantom IIs, moved to Holloman Air Force Base, New Mexico from Spangdahlem Air Base, Germany.  The 49th was the United States Air Force's first "dual-based" wing, committed to the North Atlantic Treaty Organization (NATO) and subject to immediate return to Europe when needed.  Spangdahlem remained the wing's European base, with elements left behind organized into the 7149th Tactical Fighter Wing.  The 49th's capability to rapidly deploy and operate in Europe was tested annually in a series of Crested Cap/Reforger exercises The 49th Wing's NATO commitment lasted until it was reassigned in 1970.  The first test of the wing's deployment capability took place from January through April 1969.

The 347th Tactical Fighter Wing at Mountain Home Air Force Base was assigned to the 832nd in May 1971, giving it command of all of TAC's F-111 wings.  The following year saw the retirement of the division's original aircraft, the F-100, when the last combat ready squadron in the active duty Air Force was inactivated. In September 1972, the 474th Wing deployed its F-111s to Takhli Royal Thai Air Force Base, Thailand, leaving only a small housekeeping detachment behind at Nellis.  It flew combat missions until the following March, when part of the wing returned to Nellis, leaving most of its F-111s behind in Thailand.  By August it had transferred its remaining Aardvarks to Mountain Home Air Force Base, Idaho and converted to The F-4 Phantom II. The 366th Tactical Fighter Wing returned to the division's control in October 1972, when it returned from Southeast Asia in name only to Mountain Home, where it took over the F-111s of the 347th Wing.

The division was inactivated in 1975 and its subordinate wings were assigned directly to Twelfth Air Force.

Reactivation

The division was reactivated in December 1980 at Luke Air Force Base, Arizona by absorbing the resources of Tactical Training, Luke.  The 58th and 405th Tactical Training Wings were reassigned from the former headquarters at Luke as its operational components and the 58th Combat Support Group was assigned from the 58th Wing to manage support operations for Luke. The 58th Wing conducted training with the F-4C Phantom II and the Lockheed F-104G Starfighter.  The 405th Wing flew the Northrop F-5 Freedom Fighter and the McDonnell Douglas F-15 Eagle.

Upon activation at Luke, the division mission was to supervise combat crew training programs at Luke Air Force Base, which included training pilots from West Germany, Mexico, Japan, and Saudi Arabia. Training of foreign students on fighter aircraft frequently required elements of the division to deploy to their countries to assist their governments in the conduct of training. In addition to its training mission, the 832nd was tasked to provide forces to augment the air defense of the United States in the event of an emergency. The division also participated in numerous tactical exercises

During Operations Desert Shield and Desert Storm, the division deployed combat and support elements to Southwest Asia, although it did not directly engage in operations.  The deployed personnel were replaced at Luke by reservists and Air National Guard personnel who had been called to active duty.  The division was inactivated in 1991 when the Air Force implemented the Objective Wing organization, which placed all elements on a base under a single wing and eliminated the division level of organization.

Lineage
 Established as the 832nd Air Division on 26 September 1957
 Inactivated on 1 July 1975
 Activated on 1 December 1980
 Inactivated on 1 October 1991

Assignments
 Eighteenth Air Force, 8 October 1957
 Twelfth Air Force, 1 January 1958 – 1 July 1975
 Twelfth Air Force, 1 December 1980 – 1 October 1991

Stations
 Cannon Air Force Base, New Mexico, 8 October 1957 – 1 July 1975
 Luke Air Force Base, Arizona, 1 December 1980 – 1 October 1991

Components
 Wings
  27th Tactical Fighter Wing: 18 February 1959 – 1 July 1975 (attached to 1st Air Division [Provisional] 21 October – 1 December 1962)
  49th Tactical Fighter Wing: 1 July 1968 – 1 February 1970 (attached to Seventeenth Air Force 15 January – 4 April 1969)
 Holloman Air Force Base, New Mexico
  58th Tactical Training Wing: 1 December 1980 – 1 October 1991
  140th Tactical Fighter Wing: 26 January 1968 – 30 April 1969
 Buckley Air National Guard Base until c. 1 May 1968
  312th Fighter-Bomber Wing(later 312 Tactical Fighter Wing): 8 October 1957 – 18 February 1959
  347th Tactical Fighter Wing: 15 May 1971 – 31 October 1972
  366th Tactical Fighter Wing: 1 October 1964 – 20 March 1966; 31 October 1972 – 1 July 1975
 Holloman Air Force Base, New Mexico 1964–1966
 Mountain Home Air Force Base, 1972–1975
  405th Tactical Training Wing: 1 December 1980 – 1 October 1991
  474th Fighter-Bomber Wing (later 474 Tactical Fighter Wing): 8 October 1957 – 20 January 1968; 20 March 1968 – 1 July 1975 (attached to Advanced Echelon (ADVON), Seventh Air Force, 27 September 1972 – c. 23 March 1973)
 Nellis Air Force Base after 20 March 1968

Groups
 58th Combat Support Group: 1 December 1980 – 1 October 1981
 832nd Air Base Group (later 832nd Combat Support Group): 18 February 1959 – 1 July 1967, 1 October 1981 – 1 October 1991

Squadrons
 1st Tow Target Squadron: attached 9 October 1958 – 1 January 1960
 Biggs Air Force Base, Texas
 561st Tactical Fighter Squadron: 1 July 1972 – 15 Jul 1973
 562nd Tactical Fighter Squadron: 1–31 July 1972
 563rd Tactical Fighter Squadron: 1–31 Jul 1972
 2037th Communications Squadron: 1 September 1990 – 1 October 1991
 4444th Operations Squadron (Operational Training Development): 1 April 1989 – 1 October 1991

Other
 832nd Tactical Hospital: 1 August 1959 – 1 July 1967, 16 September 1983 – 1 October 1991
 4451 USAF Hospital: 8 October 1957 – 25 January 1959
 USAF Hospital, Luke (later 832nd Medical Group): 1 December 1980 – 1 October 1991

Aircraft

 North American F-100 Super Sabre, 1957–1972
 Douglas B-26 Invader, 1958–1959
 Martin B-57 Canberra, 1958–1959
 Republic F-84F Thunderstreak, 1964–1965
 McDonnell F-4 Phantom II, 1965–1966, 1968–1970, 1980–1982
 General Dynamics F-111 Aardvark, 1968–1975
 Republic F-105 Thunderchief, 1972–1973
 Northrop F-5 Freedom Fighter, 1980–1989
 Lockheed F-104 Starfighter, 1980–1983
 Lockheed TF-104 Starfighter, 1980–1983
 McDonnell Douglas F-15 Eagle, c. 1982–1991
 General Dynamics F-16 Fighting Falcon, 1982–1991

Commanders

 Brig Gen William W. Momyer, 8 October 1957
 Brig Gen J. Stanley Holtoner, 8 July 1958
 Col Gilbert L. Meyers, 31 May 1959
 Brig Gen Virgil L. Zoller, c. 4 August 1959
 Col Harry J. Hawthorne, November 1961
 Col Albert W. Schinz, March 1962
 Brig Gen Joseph J. Kruzel, 15 January 1964
 Col Walter G. Benz Jr., by June 1965
 Col Dale S. Sweat, by December 1965
 Col Robert A. Taylor, by June 1967
 Col Robert R. Scott, c. 1 September 1967
 Col Donald N. Stanfield, 1 September 1970
 Brig Gen Robert V. Spencer, 31 March 1972
 Col Ralph E. Craycroft, 31 January 1974
 Brig Gen Robinson Risner, c. 28 February 1974 – 1 July 1975
 Brig Gen William A. Gorton, 1 December 1980
 Brig Gen Michael J. Dugan, 31 March 1981
 Maj Gen Henry D. Canterbury, 12 May 1982
 Col David L. Sherlock, 13 December 1984
 Brig Gen John M. Davey, 16 January 1985
 Brig Gen Billy G. McCoy, 25 July 1986
 Brig Gen Daniel P. Sherlock, 29 June 1987
 Brig Gen Ralph T. Browning, 4 September 1990 – 30 September 1991

Awards and campaigns

See also
 General Dynamics F-16 Fighting Falcon operators
 List of B-57 units of the United States Air Force
 List of F-100 units of the United States Air Force
 List of F-105 units of the United States Air Force
 List of Lockheed F-104 Starfighter operators
 List of McDonnell Douglas F-15 Eagle operators
 List of United States Air Force air divisions
 McDonnell Douglas F-4 Phantom II non-U.S. operators

References

Notes

Citations

Bibliography

 
 
 

Military units and formations established in 1957
Air divisions of the United States Air Force